Forquet is a surname. Notable people with the surname include:

Philippe Forquet, Viscount de Dorne, (1940–2020), French actor and aristocrat
Pietro Forquet (1925–2023), Italian bridge player